Atrisco Heritage Academy High School (AHAHS), better known as Atrisco Heritage, is a public high school in unincorporated Bernalillo County, New Mexico, United States, with an Albuquerque postal address. It is located on the area's West Mesa.  It is a part of the Albuquerque Public Schools. The school is named after the Atrisco Land Grant, which is now owned by Westland development. Enrollment at AHAHS was expected to be 2,200 in the fall of 2011.

The mascot of AHAHS is a Jaguar, chosen by the first freshman class.

Academics

School grade 
The NMPED (New Mexico Public Education Department) replaced the No Child Left Behind Act and AYP testing with a new school grading formula, which took effect in the 2010–11 school year. The grade is calculated using many forms of testing, and includes graduation rates.

Student body statistics

Athletics 
AHAHS competes in the New Mexico Activities Association (NMAA) as a class 6A school in District 5. In 2014, the NMAA realigned the state's schools in to six classifications and adjusted district boundaries. AHAHS Won the 2019 NMAA Class 5A State Basketball state championship   In addition to Atrisco Heritage Academy High School, the schools in District 5-6A include West Mesa High School, Rio Grande High School, Valley High School and Albuquerque High School.

Location for filming 
The 2012 movie The Avengers was partly filmed at Atrisco High, and the school was featured 30 seconds into the trailer.

The 2011 movie Lemonade Mouth was partially filmed here as well.

References

High schools in Albuquerque, New Mexico
Educational institutions established in 2008
Public high schools in New Mexico
2008 establishments in New Mexico